María José Sánchez Alayeto (born 20 June 1984) is a former professional tennis player  and current professional padel player from Spain. She is the twin sister of María Pilar Sánchez Alayeto.

Tennis career
María José Sánchez Alayeto has won four singles titles, and four doubles titles  in the ITF Women's Circuit. She retired from professional tennis in 2003, with a win rate of 65 % and 64 % in her singles and doubles career, respectively.

Padel Tennis career
Since 2013, she has been a professional padel player, where she was ranked No. 1 worldwide in 2019, alongside her partner and twin sister María Pilar Sánchez Alayeto. In her career, she has won 244 out of the 302 games she has played.

References

External links
 
 

1984 births
Living people
Spanish female tennis players
Female tennis players playing padel
Sportspeople from  Zaragoza
Twin sportspeople
Spanish twins